Patibhana is a 2016 Sri Lankan Sinhala drama film directed by Rabin Chandrasiri and produced by Seetha De Silva. It stars Sampath Sri Jayasighe and Niroshan Wijesinghe in lead roles along with Saman Almeida and Hasinika Karalliyadda. Music composed by Nadeeka Guruge. It is the 1244th Sri Lankan film in the Sinhala cinema.

Etymology
The film title Patibhana means Revealing the Truth.

Plot

Cast
 Sampath Sri Jayasighe as Rev. Galle Ariyadhamma Thero 'Ariyasiri' 'Podi Sira'
 Niroshan Wijesinghe as Chief Inspector Almeida
 Chandrasoma Binduhewa as Upasaka
 Shanika Bandara as Sriyalatha aka 'Latha'
 Samson Siripala as Chief monk
 Saman Almeida as Sargent Harris
 Sarath Chandrasiri
 Hasinika Karalliyadda as Village woman
 Maneesha Namalgama as Ariyasiri's stepmother
 Nimal Yatiwella as Prison chief officer
 Rohitha Mannage as Norman
 H.T. Wilson as Mike

References

2016 films
2010s Sinhala-language films